The Wraith: Remix Albums is a remix album by American hip hop duo Insane Clown Posse. Released in 2006, the album contains remixes of tracks from the group's albums The Wraith: Shangri-La (2002) and Hell's Pit (2004). The album opened at #158 on the Billboard 200, and peaked at #9 on the Top Independent Albums chart. It is the group's 7th compilation album, and their 22nd overall release.

Track listing

Shangri-La

Hell's Pit

Chart positions

References

Insane Clown Posse albums
2006 remix albums
Psychopathic Records remix albums